The curve of Wilson is the across arch curvature or posterior occlusal plane.
Arc of the curve, which is concave for mandibular teeth and convex for maxillary teeth are defined by a line drawn from left mandibular first molar to right mandibular first molar.

References

Human head and neck